Recreation Park. is a public, urban park in El Segundo, California, a suburb of Los Angeles. Located adjacent to Downtown El Segundo, Recreation Park is bordered by Pine Street on the North, Eucalyptus Drive on the West, and houses on the South and East.

References

Parks in Los Angeles County, California
El Segundo, California
Geography of Los Angeles